The 2022 UEFA Women's Futsal Championship, also referred to as UEFA Women's Futsal Euro 2022, was the second edition of the UEFA Women's Futsal Championship, the biennial international futsal championship organised by UEFA for the women's national teams of Europe.

The final tournament of this edition would originally be held in February 2021, with the qualifying rounds originally taking place in 2020. However, on 17 June 2020, UEFA announced that the final tournament had been postponed to March 2022, with the qualifying rounds postponed to 2021, due to the COVID-19 pandemic. The tournament was again later rescheduled for July 2022 in the same venue previously chosen, Gondomar, Portugal. Spain were the defending champions and they successfully defended their title beating Portugal for a second time 3–3 (1–4 in penalties).

Teams
A total of 24 (out of 55) UEFA member national teams entered the qualifying stage, with Gibraltar and Bosnia and Herzegovina making their debuts. Based on their coefficient ranking, calculated based on results in the 2019 edition, the 13 highest-ranked teams entered the main round, while the 11 lowest-ranked teams entered the preliminary round. The coefficient ranking was also used for seeding in the preliminary round and main round draws, where each team was assigned a seeding position according to their ranking for the respective draw. Three teams were pre-selected as hosts for the preliminary round and four teams were pre-selected as hosts for the main round.

The draws for the preliminary round and main round was held on 13 February 2020, 13:30 CEST (UTC+2), at the UEFA headquarters in Nyon, Switzerland. The mechanism of the draws for each round was as follows:
In the preliminary round, the 11 teams were drawn into three groups: two groups of four containing one team from each of the seeding positions 1–4, and one group of three containing one team from each of the seeding positions 1–3. First, the three teams which were pre-selected as hosts were drawn from their own designated pot and allocated to their respective group as per their seeding positions. Next, the remaining eight teams were drawn from their respective pot which were allocated according to their seeding positions (the lowest-ranked teams were allocated first to seeding position 4, then seeding position 3).
In the main round, the 16 teams were drawn into four groups of four, containing one team from each of the seeding positions 1–4. First, the four teams which were pre-selected as hosts were drawn from their own designated pot and allocated to their respective group as per their seeding positions. Next, the remaining 12 teams were drawn from their respective pot which were allocated according to their seeding positions (including the three preliminary round winners, whose identity was not known at the time of the draw, which were allocated to seeding position 4). Based on the decisions taken by the UEFA Emergency Panel, Spain and Gibraltar could not be drawn in the same group. Should Gibraltar qualify for the main round, and were drawn into the same group as Spain, they would be swapped with the relevant team from the next available group.

Notes
Teams marked in bold have qualified for the final tournament.
(H):  Teams pre-selected as hosts for the preliminary round and the main round
 (Coeff. 1.000, Rank 14) are the only team to participate in 2019 qualifying but not in 2022 qualifying.

Format
In the preliminary round and main round, each group is played as a round-robin mini-tournament at the pre-selected hosts.

In the final tournament, the four qualified teams play in knockout format (semi-finals, third place match, and final), either at a host selected by UEFA from one of the teams, or at a neutral venue.

Tiebreakers
In the preliminary round and main round, teams are ranked according to points (3 points for a win, 1 point for a draw, 0 points for a loss), and if tied on points, the following tiebreaking criteria are applied, in the order given, to determine the rankings (Regulations Articles 14.01 and 14.02):
Points in head-to-head matches among tied teams;
Goal difference in head-to-head matches among tied teams;
Goals scored in head-to-head matches among tied teams;
If more than two teams are tied, and after applying all head-to-head criteria above, a subset of teams are still tied, all head-to-head criteria above are reapplied exclusively to this subset of teams;
Goal difference in all group matches;
Goals scored in all group matches;
Penalty shoot-out if only two teams have the same number of points, and they met in the last round of the group and are tied after applying all criteria above (not used if more than two teams have the same number of points, or if their rankings are not relevant for qualification for the next stage);
Disciplinary points (red card = 3 points, yellow card = 1 point, expulsion for two yellow cards in one match = 3 points);
UEFA coefficient ranking;
Drawing of lots.

Schedule
The schedule of the competition was as follows.

In the preliminary round and main round, the schedule of each group was as follows, with one rest day between matchdays 2 and 3 for four-team groups, and no rest days for three-team groups (Regulations Articles 18.04, 18.05 and 18.06):

Note: For scheduling, the hosts are considered as Team 1, while the visiting teams are considered as Team 2, Team 3, and Team 4 according to their seeding positions.

Preliminary round
The winners of each group advance to the main round to join the 13 teams which receive byes. The preliminary round was originally scheduled to be played between 5 and 10 May 2020, but had been postponed due to the COVID-19 pandemic, initially to a later date comprised tentatively between June and September. On 17 June 2020, UEFA announced that the matches had been rescheduled to be played between 4 and 9 May 2021.

Times are CEST (UTC+2), as listed by UEFA (local times, if different, are in parentheses).

Group A

Group B

Group C

Main round
The winners of each group advance to the final tournament. The main round was originally scheduled to be played between 1 and 6 September 2020. On 17 June 2020, UEFA announced that the matches had been rescheduled to be played between 19 and 24 October 2021.

Times are CEST (UTC+2), as listed by UEFA (local times, if different, are in parentheses).

Group 1

Group 2

Group 3

Group 4

Final tournament
The final tournament was originally scheduled to be played between 11 and 14 February 2021. On 17 June 2020, UEFA announced that the matches had been rescheduled to be played between 24 and 27 March 2022. However, in March 2022, UEFA announced that the finals had been postponed until further notice, the rescheduled dates were later confirmed to be in July 2022.

Venue
Portugal were selected on 16 December 2021 from the four qualified teams to be the hosts of the final tournament.

Qualified teams
The following four teams qualified for the final tournament.

1 Bold indicates champions for that year. Italic indicates hosts for that year.

Final draw
The draw for the final tournament was held on 28 January during the half-time of the UEFA Futsal Euro 2022 final group match between Portugal and Ukraine. The four teams were drawn into two semi-finals without any restrictions.

Squads
Each national team have to submit a squad of 14 players, two of whom must be goalkeepers.

Bracket
In the semi-finals and final, extra time and penalty shoot-out are used to decide the winner if necessary; however, no extra time is used in the third place match (Regulations Article 16.02 and 16.03).

Times are CEST (UTC+2), as listed by UEFA (local times, if different, are in parentheses).

Semi-finals

Third place match

Final

References

External links

Women's Futsal Euro Matches: 2021–22, UEFA.com

2022
2020–21 in European futsal
2021–22 in European futsal
2021 in women's association football
2022 in women's association football
May 2021 sports events in Europe
August 2021 sports events in Europe
October 2021 sports events in Europe
July 2022 sports events in Portugal
Sports events postponed due to the COVID-19 pandemic
International futsal competitions hosted by Portugal
2018–19 in Portuguese football
Sport in Gondomar, Portugal
Sports events affected by the 2022 Russian invasion of Ukraine